"Maria Mercedes" is a song by the singer Thalía which was used as the soundtrack of the soap opera of the same name. The song was included in the re-released of Thalía's album Love and was promoted on TV and live performances. The song manage to give the singer another successful single. A remixed version was included in the tracklist of the digital download and streaming versions.

Background and production
After recording the album Mundo de Cristal, which earned the singer two gold albums in Mexico, the singer was invited to be part of a season of the VIP Noche program, in Spain, country where she lived for about a year, during that time she recorded songs for her third studio album Love, which was certified Platinum+Gold in the country and it later became in her second best-selling album there, with 500,000 sold. At that time the singer received an invitation from the soap opera producer Valentín Pinsteim to participate in her next soap opera entitled María Mercedes. The first edition of Love included only 12 songs. However, as Thalía's soap opera was turning into a big success, a second version of the album was issued featuring the telenovela's theme song as a bonus track. The song was released as the second single of the album, after the success of the single "Sangre" which peaked at #2 in Mexico.

Release and commercial performance
To promote the single a music video was made for Thalía's Televisa special Love... y otras fantasias. The video begins with María Mercedes selling lottery tickets and then we see scenes of Thalía singing and some clips of the telenovela. Thalía (in a red dress) dances with Jorge Luis with many of the characters of the soap opera looking to them. The video concludes with Thalía saying "Yes sir" and the people clapping. The song was successfun in Thalía's native country, it peaked at #10 in Mexico City in the charts of the newspaper El Siglo de Torreón, and #11 in Mexico in the Notitas Musicales's chart.

Track listing
Source:

Charts

References

1992 songs
1992 singles
Thalía songs
Fonovisa Records singles